The state of Louisiana is home to four federally recognized Native American tribes, the Chitimacha, the Coushatta, the Jena Band of Choctaw Indians, and the Tunica-Biloxi as well as the Houma people.

References

External links
Indigenous Tribes of New Orleans & Louisiana

Further reading
 The Historic Indian Tribes of Louisiana: From 1542 to the Present Louisiana

Demographics of Louisiana
Native American tribes in Louisiana